Darren Cahill and Mark Kratzmann were the defending champions, but lost in the second round to Ken Flach and Sven Salumaa.

Udo Riglewski and Michael Stich won the title by defeating John Fitzgerald and Laurie Warder 7–5, 6–3 in the final.

Seeds
All seeds receive a bye into the second round.

Draw

Finals

Top half

Bottom half

References

External links
 Official results archive (ATP)
 Official results archive (ITF)

1991 ATP Tour
1991 Doubles